The mountain tree frog is a species of frog in the family Hylidae endemic to Mexico.

Mountain tree frog may also refer to:

 Mountain big-eyed tree frog, a frog endemic to West Papua, Indonesia
 Mountain stream tree frog, a frog native to Australia
 Wright's mountain tree frog, a frog found in Mexico and the United States

Animal common name disambiguation pages